The crested bandfish (Lophotus guntheri) is a species of crestfish in the family Lophotidae. It has a long string-like body, with large eyes, a red dorsal fin, elongated leading rays, and a short anal fin near the caudal fin. It grows up to 2 metres in length.

Etymology
The species was presumably named for Albert Günther, an ichthyologist at the British Museum (Natural History). In his formal description, Johnston named the species guntheri, although the correct spelling for species named after Günther is guentheri. The species' common names include the crested bandfish, crestfish, unicorn fish and unicorn ribbon-fish.

Distribution and ecology
The crested bandfish is a marine pelagic species, found at depths up 90 metres, although it may occur at depths up to 300 metres. The species has been found in four locations in the western Pacific: in Australia, near Emu Bay, Tasmania and off the New South Wales coast; Johnston Atoll; and southwestern Taiwan. However, its true distribution is likely wider than this. The species' diet comprises cephalopods and small fish. It has an ink sac, which may be used as a defence mechanism when it encounters danger.

Conservation
Very little is known about the crested bandfish, although specimens have been reported to wash ashore following storms. The crested bandfish has been evaluated as "Least Concern" for the IUCN Red List.

References

Notes

Citations

Fauna of Victoria (Australia)
Marine fish of Tasmania
Fish described in 1883